Deviled eggs (also known as stuffed eggs, Russian eggs, or dressed eggs) are hard-boiled eggs that have been shelled, cut in half, and filled with a paste made from the egg yolks mixed with other ingredients such as mayonnaise and mustard.  They are generally served cold as a side dish, appetizer or a main course during gatherings or parties. The dish's origin can be seen in recipes for boiled, seasoned eggs as far back as ancient Rome, where they were traditionally served as a first course. The dish is popular in Europe, North America and Australia.

Etymology
The word deviled, in reference to food, was in use in the 18th century, with the first known print reference appearing in 1786. In the 19th century, it came to be used most often with spicy or zesty food, including eggs prepared with mustard, pepper or other ingredients stuffed in the yolk cavity.  Similar uses of "devil" for spiced foods include deviled ham and  sauce (from the Italian word for devil).

At church functions in parts of the Southern and Midwestern United States, the terms "stuffed eggs", "salad eggs", and "dressed eggs" are used instead, due to a word taboo against mentioning the Devil in certain denominations of Christianity.

History

The deviled egg can be traced back to ancient Rome, where boiled eggs were seasoned with spicy sauces and served as a starter meal during gatherings and feasts. Serving eggs while entertaining guests was so common for wealthy Romans, they even had a saying for it, "ab ova usque ad mala", meaning "from eggs to apples", or from the beginning of a meal to the end.

Recipes for hard-boiled eggs stuffed with herbs, cheese and raisins can be found in the cookery texts of medieval European cuisine.

The earliest known recipe for stuffed eggs, and the one that most closely resembles the modern-day deviled egg, is believed to have been written in the Andalusian region of Spain during the 13th century. According to the English translation of a recipe found in an unnamed 13th century Andalusian cookbook, boiled egg yolks were mixed with cilantro (coriander), pepper, and onion juice, then beat with murri (a sauce made of fermented barley or fish), oil and salt. The mixture was then stuffed into the hollowed-out egg whites, and the two halves of the egg were fastened back together with a small stick and topped with pepper.

The earliest known American recipe for deviled eggs was printed in the Montgomery Advertiser, a local news publication in Montgomery, Alabama, in 1877.
The first known recipe to suggest the use of mayonnaise as an ingredient in deviled eggs was in the 1896 version of an American cookbook named The Boston Cooking School Cook Book by Fannie Farmer.

Preparation and ingredients

Cooled hard-boiled eggs are peeled and halved lengthwise, with the yolks then removed. (They can be cut crosswise for more filling). The yolk is then mashed and mixed with a variety of other ingredients.<ref>[https://www.bbc.co.uk/dna/h2g2/A39787131The Art of Making Devilled Eggs] (2008-08-08)</ref> These usually incorporate a fat-based product (such as butter, heavy cream, or mayonnaise) with spicy and/or piquant ingredients to contrast taste (and, sometimes, texture). One recipe has the yolks mashed with mayonnaise, dijon mustard, vinegar, pickle relish and salt and pepper. The yolk mixture is then scooped into each egg "cup" formed by the firm egg whites. 

Ingredient choices vary widely and there is no "set" standard recipe. Although mayonnaise is most common, some recipes use butter, and sweet pickle relish sometimes replaces the sour pickles. 

Variations

There are many variations on the basic recipe that may add ingredients such as:

In different countries

In the United States, deviled eggs are a common dish that are typically served as hors d'oeuvres or appetizers during gatherings and parties.
The eggs are boiled, cooled, shelled, and then sliced in half. The yolk is then removed and mixed with other ingredients, such as mayonnaise, mustard, vinegar, pickle relish, and other spices and herbs. It is then blended into a smooth paste which is used to fill the hollowed-out egg whites. They are generally served cold and are often dusted with paprika.

The earliest known American recipe for deviled eggs was printed in the Montgomery Advertiser, a news publication in Montgomery, Alabama, in 1877. 
The first known recipe to use mayonnaise as an ingredient in deviled eggs was in the 1896 version of an American cookbook named The Boston Cooking School Cookbook by Fannie Farmer. In this early recipe, the mayonnaise was recommended as a binding agent for the yolk mixture.  
Deviled eggs have been a popular dish in the United States dating as far back as the 1920s. In 1923, Wanda Barton suggested in her newspaper column, “Home-Making Helps”, to save egg cartons because “they are fine for carrying boiled or deviled eggs.” 
By the 1940s, deviled eggs had become a staple food at picnics, parties and gatherings in the United States. 
According to an online survey commissioned by McCormick in 2019, nearly 61 percent of Americans planned to make and/or eat deviled eggs during Easter Sunday of that same year. 

In many European countries, especially Belgium, France, the Netherlands and Germany, a variation is served known as "Russian eggs". This consists of eggs cut in half, served with vegetable macédoine and garnished with mayonnaise, parsley and tomato. Contrary to what the name might suggest, the dish does not originate in Russia; its name derives from the fact that the eggs are served on a bed of macédoine, which is sometimes called "Russian salad".

In France, the dish is called œuf mimosa ("mimosa egg", named after the appearance of the mimosa tree); in Hungary, töltött tojás ("stuffed egg") or kaszinótojás ("casino egg"); in Romania, ouă umplute ("stuffed eggs"); in Poland, jajka faszerowane ("stuffed eggs"); in the Netherlands gevuld ei ("stuffed egg"); in Sweden fyllda ägg ("stuffed eggs"); on the island of Malta bajd mimli ("stuffed eggs"). In parts of South America, it is called huevos a la peruana ("Peruvian eggs").

In Sweden, the deviled egg (Fyllda Ägghalvor)'' is a traditional dish for the Easter Smörgåsbord, where the yolk is mixed with caviar, cream or sour cream, optionally chopped red onion, and decorated with chopped chives or dill, perhaps with a piece of anchovy or pickled herring. In French cuisine, the other ingredients are most likely to be pepper and parsley. In Hungarian cuisine, the yolks are mashed and mixed with white bread soaked in milk, mustard and parsley, often served as an appetizer with mayonnaise, or as a main course baked in the oven with Hungarian sour cream topping and served with French fries. Other common flavorings of the yolks in German cuisine are anchovies, cheese and caper.

See also

 Egg salad
 Mimosa salad
 List of egg dishes
 List of hors d'oeuvre
 List of stuffed dishes

References

External links

American cuisine
Egg dishes
European cuisine
Chilean cuisine
Argentine cuisine
Uruguayan cuisine
Ukrainian cuisine
Articles containing video clips
Stuffed dishes